Victor José Pozzo (born February 1, 1914, in Buenos Aires) was an Argentine professional football player. He also held Italian citizenship.

Honours
 Serie A champion: 1939/40.
 Coppa Italia winner: 1938/39.

1914 births
Year of death missing
Argentine footballers
Racing Club de Avellaneda footballers
Talleres de Remedios de Escalada footballers
Serie A players
Serie B players
Inter Milan players
Atalanta B.C. players
Calcio Padova players
Novara F.C. players
S.S.D. Varese Calcio players
Parma Calcio 1913 players
Argentine expatriate footballers
Expatriate footballers in Switzerland
Argentine emigrants to Italy
Grasshopper Club Zürich players
Association football defenders
Footballers from Buenos Aires